Air Moana is an airline in French Polynesia. Its main hub is at Faa'a International Airport. It operates domestic flights within French Polynesia using two ATR-72 aircraft.

The airline was established in January 2022 by Christian Vernaudon, a former head of Air Tahiti, with plans to use ATR aircraft to fly domestic flights to the Society islands and Tuamotus. it secured its domestic operating licence in December 2022, with its first aircraft arriving later that month. In December 2022 Sofidep, the French Polynesian development finance company, took a stake in the airline.

It secured its air operators certificate in February 2023. It made its inaugural flight to Bora Bora on 8 February 2023.

The airline took delivery of its second ATR 72–600 in March 2023.

References

External links
 Official website

Airlines of French Polynesia
Airlines established in 2022
2022 establishments in Oceania